The 2019 Wales Rally GB (also known as Wales Rally GB 2019) was a motor racing event for rally cars held over four days between 3 and 6 October 2019. It marked the seventy-fifth running of Wales Rally GB and was the twelfth round of the 2019 World Rally Championship, World Rally Championship-2 and the newly-created WRC-2 Pro class. It was also the final round of the Junior World Rally Championship.

Reigning World Drivers' and World Co-Drivers Champions Sébastien Ogier and Julien Ingrassia were the defending rally winners. M-Sport Ford WRT, the team they drove for in 2018, were the defending manufacturers' winners. The Finnish crew of Kalle Rovanperä and Jonne Halttunen were the defending rally winners in the World Rally Championship-2 category, but they did not defend their titles as they were scheduled to be promoted to the newly-created WRC-2 Pro class.

Ott Tänak and Martin Järveoja won their first Wales Rally GB victory, extending their championship lead to a massive twenty-eight points. Their team, Toyota Gazoo Racing WRT, were the manufacturers' winners. The Škoda Motorsport crew of Kalle Rovanperä and Jonne Halttunen secured the first WRC-2 Pro title by winning the category, finishing first in the combined WRC-2 category. 2003 World Rally Champions Petter Solberg and Phil Mills bid farewell to WRC by winning the WRC-2 class. The Rally Team Spain crew of Jan Solans and Mauro Barreiro won the final round of the J-WRC championship and became the champions of 2019 Junior World Rally Championship.

Background

Championship standings prior to the event
Ott Tänak and Martin Järveoja led both the drivers' and co-drivers' championships with a seventeen-point lead ahead of defending world champions Sébastien Ogier and Julien Ingrassia. Thierry Neuville and Nicolas Gilsoul were third, a further thirteen points behind. In the World Rally Championship for Manufacturers, Hyundai Shell Mobis WRT held a nineteen-point lead over Toyota Gazoo Racing WRT.

In the World Rally Championship-2 Pro standings, Kalle Rovanperä and Jonne Halttunen led by fifty-six points in the drivers' and co-drivers' standings respectively. Gus Greensmith and Elliott Edmondson tied with Mads Østberg and Torstein Eriksen in second. In the manufacturers' championship, Škoda Motorsport led M-Sport Ford WRT by thirty-seven points, with Citroën Total over a hundred points behind in third.

In the World Rally Championship-2 standings, Kajetan Kajetanowicz and Maciej Szczepaniak tied with Nikolay Gryazin and Yaroslav Fedorov in first, with Benito Guerra and Jaime Zapata were third, only four points separating the top three.

In the Junior-World Rally Championship standings, Tom Kristensson and Henrik Appelskog led Jan Solans and Mauro Barreiro by just a point in the drivers' and co-drivers' standings respectively, with Dennis Rådström and Johan Johansson thirty-three points further behind in third in their own standings. In the Nations' standings, Sweden were first, thirteen points cleared of Spain, with Germany forty points further behind in third.

Entry list
The following crews entered into the rally. The event opened to crews competing in the World Rally Championship, World Rally Championship-2, WRC-2 Pro and privateer entries not registered to score points in any championship. A total of fifty-nine entries were received, with eleven crews entered with World Rally Cars and twenty-one entered the World Rally Championship-2. Five crews were nominated to score points in the Pro class. A further eleven entries were received for the Junior World Rally Championship.

Route
The heart of Llandudno on the coast of north Wales served as the rally base for Wales Rally GB this year, with a purpose-built special stage at the Oulton Park circuit as the opening stage of the rally on Thursday evening.

Itinerary
All dates and times are BST (UTC+1).

Report

World Rally Cars
The M-Sport Ford WRT crew of Elfyn Evans and Scott Martin returned to the championship after Evans injured his back during Rally Estonia. Ott Tänak started his rally with a near-10-second time loss because of an engine issue in the slippery opening stage, but he grabbed a narrow lead from teammate Kris Meeke going into Saturday after a day's effort. Esapekka Lappi retired from Friday after went off the road, while Jari-Matti Latvala retired from the rally after a heavy crash. Craig Breen rolled his i20 on Saturday morning, but it only cost cosmetic damage. Tänak won in style eventually.

Classification

Special stages

Championship standings

World Rally Championship-2 Pro
Kalle Rovanperä, who just celebrated his 19th birthday, led comfortably in the front until a puncture made his lead lost to his teammate Jan Kopecký. Mads Østberg and Hayden Paddon retired from Friday due to oil leak and car beached. In the second leg, Rovanperä regained the top spot from his teammate as Kopecký firstly punctured and then rolled his car. Hayden Paddon restarted on Saturday, but retired from the day again after he suffered two punctures. Gus Greensmith also retired from the day after hitting a bank and damaged his rear-right suspension. Rovanperä took the rally in the end to win the 2019 WRC-2 Pro championship.

Classification

Special stages
Results in bold denote first in the RC2 class, the class which both the WRC-2 Pro and WRC-2 championships run to.

Championship standings
Bold text indicates 2019 World Champions.

World Rally Championship-2
Pierre-Louis Loubet led the class after a trouble-free run. Kajetan Kajetanowicz retired from Friday with three punctures, while Ole Christian Veiby retired from the first leg with a broken track control arm. Petter Solberg overtook Loubet to lead the category in the second loop of Saturday. His son Oliver Solberg made a sensational return after he exited his WRC debut due to steering issue on Friday, setting two fastest stage times until he stopped because of technical problems. Eventually, the 2003 World Champion won the class, ending his 20-year-long career in satisfactory.

Classification

Special stages
Results in bold denote first in the RC2 class, the class which both the WRC-2 Pro and WRC-2 championships run to.

Championship standings

Junior World Rally Championship
Jan Solans fended off championship leader Tom Kristensson, while Dennis Rådström went off the road and retired from Friday despite holding an early lead. On Saturday, Kristensson suffered a puncture and dropping over three minutes. Following title rival Kristensson's problem, Solans was clear in front. The Spaniard successfully sealed the win to snatch the junior title.

Classification

Special stages

Championship standings
Bold text indicates 2019 World Champions.

Notes

References

External links
  
 2019 Wales Rally GB in e-wrc website
 The official website of the World Rally Championship

Britain
2019 in British motorsport
October 2019 sports events in the United Kingdom
2019